"I Laugh in Your Face" is a ballad performed by the Bee Gees, written by Barry, Robin & Maurice Gibb and released in March 1969 on the album Odessa. Most of the vocals are performed by Barry Gibb except for a short central section  sung by Robin Gibb.
It was recorded on July 12, 1968. the same day as the band recorded their hit song "I've Gotta Get a Message to You". The mono mix made at this time, when it was presumably intended as the  B-side of "Message", was released in 2009 on the Sketches for Odessa disc that accompanied the remastered edition of the album. Its demo version, recorded the same day, also featured on the Sketches disc.

Personnel
 Barry Gibb — lead and harmony vocal, guitar
 Robin Gibb — lead and harmony vocal
 Maurice Gibb — bass, piano, guitar, harmony vocal
 Colin Petersen — drums
 Bill Shepherd — orchestral arrangement

References

1969 songs
Bee Gees songs
Songs written by Barry Gibb
Songs written by Robin Gibb
Songs written by Maurice Gibb
Song recordings produced by Robert Stigwood
Song recordings produced by Barry Gibb
Song recordings produced by Robin Gibb
Song recordings produced by Maurice Gibb
Pop ballads